The 2011–12 Ekstraklasa was the 78th season of the highest level of football leagues in Poland since its establishment in 1927. It started on 29 July 2011 and concluded on 6 May 2012. A total of 16 teams participated, 14 of which competed in the league during the 2010–11 season, while the remaining two were promoted from the 2010–11 season of the I Liga. Each team played a total of 30 matches, half at home and half away.

Śląsk Wrocław won the title, which marked their 2nd title in Ekstraklasa history.

The defending champions were Wisła Kraków, who won their 13th Polish championship in the previous season.

Teams
Arka Gdynia and Polonia Bytom were relegated to the I Liga after finishing last season in the 2 bottom places and were replaced by ŁKS Łódź, winners of the 2010–11 I Liga season and runners-up Podbeskidzie Bielsko-Biała.

Therefore, ŁKS Łódź returned to the Ekstraklasa after a 2-season break, while Podbeskidzie Bielsko-Biała made their first Ekstraklasa appearance in the club's history.

Stadiums and locations

Sponsoring and personnel

Managerial changes

League table

Results

Player statistics

Top goalscorers

Top assistants

Player of the month

See also
2011–12 Polish Cup

References

External links
Official site
2011–12 Ekstraklasa at Soccerway

Ekstraklasa seasons
Poland
1